Elling is a 2001 Norwegian film about a man with autism.

Elling may also refer to:

 Elling, Denmark
 Elling (play), a 2007 British play based on the film
 Elling (name)

See also
 Elling Woman, a naturally mummified Danish bog body discovered in 1938